The Owen Thomas Car Company was founded in 1908 in Janesville, Wisconsin, by W. Owen Thomas of Chicago in a machine shop that belonged to the Chicago & North Western Railroad. It survived till 1910.

History
The company made cars that were called Owen Thomas "Sixes.". They had air-cooled, 60 hp six-cylinder engines. One advanced feature was that instead of a carb., the Owen Thomas had an early type of fuel injection system based on early aviation practices. The wheelbase was a long 136". The company went out of business in Sept. of 1910, the official reason was because the backers could not get a Selden license.

References

History of Wisconsin
Janesville, Wisconsin
Defunct motor vehicle manufacturers of the United States
1908 establishments in Wisconsin
1910 disestablishments in Wisconsin
American companies established in 1908
Brass Era vehicles
1900s cars
Motor vehicle manufacturers based in Wisconsin
Cars introduced in 1908
Vehicle manufacturing companies established in 1908
Vehicle manufacturing companies disestablished in 1910